The following is a list of synods and presbyteries that composed the former United Presbyterian Church in the United States of America on December 31, 1968. The UPCUSA was the largest body, often erroneously referred to as "Northern," of Presbyterianism in the U.S., prior to its 1983 merger with the Presbyterian Church in the United States, whose churches were located entirely within the Southern and border states.

The judicatory territories enumerated here were altered at least once during the 1970s by the UPCUSA General Assembly, which, in turn, gave way to entirely new boundaries during the formative years of the current Presbyterian Church (USA) in the mid-1980s.

Synods are listed in bold, with their presbyteries underneath them, along with the number of congregations and total membership in the presbytery at that time. States included in territories are in parentheses, unless referred to in the synod or presbytery's name.

Sources
Minutes of the General Assembly of the United Presbyterian Church in the United States of America, Part III: The Statistical Tables and Presbytery Rolls, January 1-December 31, 1968, Office of the General Assembly, Philadelphia, 1969.

1968 in the United States
Former Presbyterian denominations